Orshansky District (Oršanke kundem) is an administrative and municipal district (raion), one of the fourteen in the Mari El Republic, Russia. It is located in the north of the republic. Its administrative center is the urban locality (an urban-type settlement) of Orshanka. As of the 2010 Census, the total population of the district was 15,139, with the population of Orshanka accounting for 43.5% of that number.

Administrative and municipal status
Within the framework of administrative divisions, Orshansky District is one of the fourteen in the republic. It is divided into one urban-type settlement (an administrative division with the administrative center in the urban-type settlement (inhabited locality) of Orshanka) and three rural okrugs, all of which comprise seventy-two rural localities. As a municipal division, the district is incorporated as Orshansky Municipal District. Orshanka Urban-Type Settlement is incorporated into an urban settlement, and the three rural okrugs are incorporated into three rural settlements within the municipal district. The urban-type settlement of Orshanka serves as the administrative center of both the administrative and municipal district.

References

Notes

Sources



Districts of Mari El